Projecto Moda ("Project Fashion") is a Portuguese reality competition TV show that ran for one season, from 25 July to 26 September 2010, on public network RTP1. It is the Portuguese installment of the Project Runway franchise.

The host of the show was Nayma Mingas, a former model.
Paulo Gomes was the mentor. Manuel Alves, a fashion designer, and Fátima Cotta, the director of Elle Magazine Portugal, were the judges for the season. The other permanent judge was Cristina Pinho, a spokesperson from Modalfa, a Portuguese fashion store.
The show had 10 contestants, and only two finalists. The show had 10 episodes that aired weekly.

Contestants

Designers
The 10 designers in season 1 are:

Models
The 10 models in season 1 are:

Challenges

: Although this was not a team challenge, the judges considered that both designers had outfits, that were good enough to be considered winners.
: Although this was a team challenge the designers were evaluated individually. In this episode there was not a bottom two.
: The judges did not split the group into "high" or "low" scorers. Hence, there was no winner; designers either advanced to finale or were eliminated.

Results
 Green background and WINNER means the designer won Projecto Moda.
 Blue background and WIN means the designer won that challenge.
 Light blue background and HIGH means the designer had one of the highest scores for that challenge, but did not win.
 Pink background and LOW means the designer had one of the lowest scores for that challenge, but was not eliminated.
 Orange background and LOW means the designer was in the bottom two, but was not eliminated;
 Red background and OUT means the designer lost and was out of the competition.

Episode Summary

Episode 1: Preto no Branco  

Original Airdate: July 25, 2010

The designers were asked to create a dress for Vicky Fernandes, who was considered many times one of the most beautiful women in Portugal. However, there was a twist. The designers couldn't select the fabric of their dresses, Instead they took two samples of fabric out of a bag without looking at it. They were preassigned models for their challenge, given 30 minutes to sketch their design, and three days to complete the outfit. The winner has immunity for the next challenge and cannot be eliminated.

Judges: Nayma Mingas; Manuel Alves; Fátima Cotta; Cristina Pinho and Vicky Fernandes.
WINNER: Pedro
OUT: Vanda

Episode 2: Supermercado

Original Airdate: August 1, 2010

The designers were asked to create an outfit made only from materials bought at a supermarket. They had a budget of €60, 1 hour to make their purchases and one day to complete the outfit. The winner has immunity for the next challenge and cannot be eliminated.

Judges: Nayma Mingas; Manuel Alves; Fátima Cotta; Cristina Pinho and Ricardo Araújo Pereira.
WINNER: Carina
OUT: Joana

Episode 3: Saída de Praia

Original Airdate: August 8, 2010

The designers had to create an outfit with a beach theme. They are given two minutes to collect provided fabrics hanging from clotheslines in a storeroom, and only one day to complete the outfit. The winner has immunity for the next challenge and cannot be eliminated.

Judges: Nayma Mingas; Manuel Alves; Fátima Cotta; Cristina Pinho and Carlos Ramos.
WINNER: Vera
OUT: Ana

Episode 4: Farda Futurista

Original Airdate: August 15, 2010

The designers had to create a uniform of the future, for the employees of Modalfa (the official sponsor of Projecto Moda). The fabrics were provided and each designer chose one at a random order. The winner has immunity for the next challenge and cannot be eliminated.

Judges: Nayma Mingas; Manuel Alves; Fátima Cotta; Cristina Pinho and Pedro Mourão.
WINNER: Pedro 
OUT: Rosina

Episode 5: Volta ao Mundo em 48 Horas

Original Airdate: August 22, 2010
Judges: Nayma Mingas; Manuel Alves; Fátima Cotta; Cristina Pinho and Catarina Furtado.
WINNER: Carina and Vera
OUT: João

Episode 6: Moda de Estimação

Original Airdate: August 29, 2010
Judges: Nayma Mingas; Manuel Alves; Fátima Cotta; Cristina Pinho and Dino Alves.
WINNER: Pedro
OUT: Amorim

Episode 7: Não há duas sem três

Original Airdate: September 5, 2010
Judges: Nayma Mingas; José Manuel Gonçalves (sitting in for Manuel Alves); Fátima Cotta; Cristina Pinho and Manuel Serrão.
WINNER:  Pedro
OUT: André

Episode 8: Ícones Mundiais da Música

Original Airdate: September 12, 2010

Judges: Nayma Mingas; Manuel Alves; Fátima Cotta; Cristina Pinho and Guta Moura Guedes.
ADVANCED: Carina and Pedro
OUT: Vera

Episode 9: Best Of

Original Airdate: September 19, 2010

Episode 9, was the recap episode.

Episode 10: Finale

Original Airdate: September 26, 2010

Judges: Nayma Mingas; Manuel Alves; Fátima Cotta; Cristina Pinho and Paulo Gomes.
WINNER: Carina
OUT: Pedro

References

Project Runway
2010 in Portuguese television
2010 in fashion
Portuguese fashion
2010 Portuguese television series debuts
2010 Portuguese television series endings